The Albatros L 82 was a 1920s German trainer biplane. Of conventional configuration, it seated the pilot and instructor in separate, open cockpits. The wings were single-bay, equal-span, and unstaggered.

Operational history
The prototype and one production L 82b took part in the Challenge 1929 international contest, during which the prototype (D-1704) crashed on 10 August 1929 in Turnu Severin, pilot Karl Ziegler. The second example (D-1706) completed the contest in 27th place, pilot Werner Junck).

Variants
 L 82a - prototype with de Havilland Gipsy engine
 L 82b - single example with Siemens-Halske Sh 13 engine
 L 82c - production version with Siemens-Halske Sh 14 engine

Specifications (L 82c)

See also

Notes

Bibliography

External links

 German Aviation 1919–1945

Single-engined tractor aircraft
Biplanes
1920s German civil trainer aircraft
L 082
Aircraft first flown in 1929